Flight 655 may refer to:

Texas International Airlines Flight 655, crashed on 27 September 1973
Iran Air Flight 655, shot down on 3 July 1988

0655